John Aiken may refer to:
John Macdonald Aiken (1880–1961), Scottish painter
John Aiken (RAF officer) (1921–2005), British Air Chief Marshal
John Aiken (ice hockey) (born 1932), American ice hockey player
John Aiken (basketball), American basketball coach at McNeese State
John Aiken (cricketer) (born 1970), New Zealand cricketer, psychologist and television personality
John Aiken (sculptor) (born 1950), Irish sculptor
John W. Aiken (died 1968), American furniture finisher and socialist activist

See also
John Aitken (disambiguation)
John Aikin (Unitarian) (1713–1780) English Unitarian scholar and theological tutor